Fred W. Romkema (born July 3, 1947) is an American politician and a Republican member of the South Dakota House of Representatives representing District 31 since January 2009.

Education
Romkema earned his BA and MA degrees from the University of South Dakota.

Elections
2012 With Republican Representative Charles Turbiville term limited and leaving a District 31 seat open, Romkema ran in the four-way June 5, 2012 Republican Primary and placed first with 1,467 votes (31.4%); Romkema and fellow Republican nominee Timothy Johns were unopposed for the November 6, 2012 General election, where Romkema took the first seat with 6,721 votes (52%) and Johns took the second seat.
2008 When District 30 incumbent Republican Representative Tom Hills ran for South Dakota Senate and left a District 31 seat open, Romkema ran in the three-way June 3, 2008 Republican Primary and placed first with 1,898 votes (40.7%); in the three-way November 4, 2008 General election Romkema took the first seat with 6,783 votes (38.1%) and incumbent Republican Representative Charles Turbiville took the second seat ahead of Democratic nominee Kevin O'Dea.
2010 Romkema, incumbent Representative Turbiville, and returning 2008 Democratic opponent O'Dea were unopposed for their primaries, setting up a three-way rematch; in the three-way November 2, 2010 General election Romkema took the first seat with 6,335 votes (40%) and Representative Turbiville took the second seat ahead of Democratic nominee Kevin O'Dea.

References

External links
Official page at the South Dakota Legislature
Campaign site
 

People from Artesia, California
1947 births
Living people
Republican Party members of the South Dakota House of Representatives
People from Spearfish, South Dakota
University of South Dakota alumni
21st-century American politicians